Terebella is a genus of polychaetes belonging to the family Terebellidae.

Species:

Terebella hessli 
Terebella lapidaria 
Terebella pterochaeta 
Terebella rubra 
Terebella turgidula

References

Polychaetes